Kiszka is a surname. Notable people with the surname include:
 Kiszka family, an extinct Polish noble family
 Josh Kiszka, Jake Kiszka and Sam Kiszka, three brothers and members of the rock band Greta Van Fleet
 Emil Kiszka (1926–2007), Polish sprinter
 Jan Kiszka (1552–1592), politician and magnate
 Janusz Kiszka (1600–1653), Polish politician and magnate
 Lev Kiszka (1663–1728), Metropolitan of Kiev from 1714 to 1728
 Piotr Kiszka (died 1534), noble of the House of Kiszka
 Stanisław Kiszka (died 1510s), noble, diplomat and military commander

See also
 
 Kishka (disambiguation)

Polish-language surnames